State Road 337 in the U.S. State of Indiana is divided into a northern section and a southern section.

Route description

Southern section
Starting at State Road 64 in Depauw it runs along rolling hills toward Corydon. The Harrison County Hospital is located on the stretch next to Interstate 64 . An interchange with Interstate 64 is proposed to relieve traffic flow on nearby State Road 135. From Corydon, State Road 337 runs south-southeast for about twelve miles (19 km) to its southern terminus with State Road 11.

Northern section

The northern section begins at State Road 37 (its parent route) in Orleans, where it is concurrent with East Washington Street. Upon reaching the east edge of town, the road begins winding to the southeast. It passes through the small community of Bromer and terminates at State Road 56 just west of Livonia.

Major intersections

References

External links

Indiana Highway Ends - SR 337

337
Transportation in Harrison County, Indiana
Transportation in Orange County, Indiana
Transportation in Washington County, Indiana